Perunthalaivar Makkal Katchi (PTMK) is a political party in the Indian state of Tamil Nadu.

History 
The party is floated as forum by the nadar community who have nativity in southern tamil nadu
The party believes and focused to get high turnouts with its vote base mainly concentrated towards the nadar's in the southern region of Tamil Nadu.

Election history

Election Alliance 
The ruling Dravida Munnetra Kazhagam (DMK) in Tamil Nadu on allotted one seat for them. Both parties signed an agreement in this regard at the DMK headquarters here after talks with DMK president and Chief Minister M. Karunanidhi. Mr. Dhanapalan is the party candidate contesting with the DMK symbol.

References

External links
 Official Webpage of Perunthalaivar Makkal Katchi (PTMK)

Political parties in Tamil Nadu
Political parties established in 2011
State political parties in Tamil Nadu
Dravidian political parties
Regionalist parties in India
2011 establishments in Tamil Nadu